Mansa Sandaki or Sandaki Mari Djata, also known as Sandiki or Santigi, was a mansa of the Mali Empire from 1389 to 1390.

As Sandaki of Musa II
During the reign of Mansa Musa II (1374-1387), the empire was run by the court's sandaki ("high counselor"). Sandaki Mari Djata, who had no relation to the famous founder of the same name, proved an apt if not ruthless leader. He launched a military campaign to put down rebellions in the eastern section of the empire that met with mixed results. At the same time, he imprisoned the mansa for attempting to take back his authority.

Usurpation of Maghan II
When Mansa Musa II died in 1387, the throne went to his brother Maghan II (1387-1389). Sandaki Mari Djata refused to give up power and killed him. From 1389 to 1390, Sandaka Mari Djata ruled Mali as the second of two non-Keita monarchs in the empire's history.

Regicide
The last brother of Musa II, Mahmud killed Sandaki Mari Djata in 1390. He became mansa that same year, restoring the Keita dynasty back to the throne.

See also
Mali Empire
Keita Dynasty

References

1390 deaths
Mansas of Mali
People of the Mali Empire
14th-century monarchs in Africa
Year of birth unknown